Jasper County is a county located in the U.S. state of Indiana. As of 2010, the population was 33,478. The county seat is Rensselaer.

Jasper County is included in the Chicago-Naperville-Elgin, IL-IN-WI Metropolitan Statistical Area.

History
The lands of present NW Indiana were explored by French explorer Robert de LaSalle. At that time the area was inhabited by the Miami Confederation of Indians. Through White settlement, encroachment, and confrontation, the various indigenous groups were forced to cede their claim to the area. In October 1818, the Pottawattamies, Weas, and Delawares ceded their lands west of the Tippecanoe River to the government. In a treaty dated 23 October 1826, the Pottawattamies and Miamis ceded all their lands east of the Tippecanoe. A treaty dated 26 October 1832 with the Pottawattamies ceded control of the northwestern part of Indiana; on 27 October the Pottawattamies of Indiana and Michigan also relinquished all claim to any remaining land in those states.

Until the 1832 treaty of 1832, the future Jasper County area was not open to settlement; those who did come to Indiana before that time had flooded the southern parts of Ohio, Indiana and Illinois through the Ohio Valley. Northwestern Indiana was also less desirable for initial settlement, the land being described as alternate swamps, sterile sand ridges and flat, wet prairies. It did proliferate in game, however, and eventually settlers found it. The first recorded settler was William Donahue, who located in present-day Gillam Township. He was a justice of the peace during the period prior to the county's establishment.

Although the settlers were sparse, the state legislature provided for two counties to be established in the area. The state legislature passed an omnibus bill that authorized thirteen counties and described their boundaries, although their governing structures were not established at that time. The new counties of Jasper and Newton were attached to White County for political and civil purposes.

In 1836 all the area north of the Kankakee River was partitioned from Jasper as Porter County. By 1837 preparations were being made to create the Jasper County governing structure, with a county commission being elected that year. They first met in January 1838 at the house of Robert Alexander in present-day Benton County. After that, the pro tem county seat was designated as the residence of George W. Spitler, in present-day Iroquois Township, Newton County, where the first meeting was held in March 1839. The official date of formation of the Jasper County government is given as 15 March 1838.

Jasper County was named for Sgt. William Jasper, a famous scout for the Continental Army during the American Revolutionary War. Jasper became famous in 1776, during the bombardment of Fort Moultrie, for erecting a new flagstaff under fire after the American flag had been shot down. Jasper was killed during the Siege of Savannah in 1779. Jasper County's twin county, Newton County, was named after Jasper's friend and comrade, John Newton.

A state legislature act dated 29 January 1839 caused the consolidation of Jasper and Newton, with Jasper retaining the name, and Newton (for the time being) being erased, and the consolidated area being seated at the Falls of the Iroquois River, with the name of Newton (the community's name was changed to Rensselaer in 1844). In 1840 the county of Benton was formed from Jasper's area. In 1859 the county of Newton was revived but with smaller area than before, leaving Jasper in its present form.

The Civil War
As early as 1825, the majority of the population were against slavery. By the time of the War, Jasper County was one of the few counties of Indiana that had a military organization under the law of 1855. The war greatly affected Jasper County when 935 soldiers were enlisted on behalf of the Union. This was considered an impressive amount at the time with the average population around 5,000. Although there were several companies from Indiana, the 9th Indiana Infantry Regiment produced Robert H. Milroy, the "Gray Eagle of the Army". Milroy became famous for suppressing Confederate mountain rangers, which caused the Confederate Congress to declare a $100,000 bounty on his head. The 9th Indiana Infantry Regiment became known for its involvement in the Battle of Philippi, one of the earliest battles of the Civil War at Laurel Hill (now known as Laurel Mountain). In comparing the proportions of men able to fight, Indiana contributed more soldiers than any other state to the Union.

Geography
Until the middle of the 19th century when it was drained to make farmland, this county was part of the second largest freshwater wetland in the US, with abundant flora and fauna. This is caused by the Iroquois River, one of the main tributaries of the Kankakee River that flows throughout Jasper County, a major water source for the area.

Major highways

Railroads 
 CSX Transportation
 Norfolk Southern Railway
 Toledo, Peoria and Western Railway

Adjacent counties

Municipalities
The municipalities in Jasper County, and their populations as of the 2010 Census, are:

Cities
 Rensselaer – 5,859

Towns

Census-designated places

Unincorporated communities

Townships
The 13 townships of Jasper County, with their populations as of the 2010 Census, are:

Education
Residents of Jasper County attend public schools administered by four different districts in multiple counties:
 Kankakee Valley School Corporation 
 Rensselaer Central Schools Corporation
 Tri-County School Corporation
 West Central School Corporation

High Schools
 Kankakee Valley High School 
 Rensselaer Central High School 
 Covenant Christian High School in DeMotte (grades 9–12)

Middle Schools
 Kankakee Valley Middle School 
 Rensselaer Central Middle School 

Elementary Schools
 DeMotte Christian Elementary School (preschool through 8)
 DeMotte Elementary School 
 Kankakee Valley Intermediate School 
 St. Augustine Catholic School
 Tri-County Primary School (K-2nd)
 Van Rensselaer Elementary School 
 Wheatfield Elementary School

Colleges and Universities
 Saint Joseph's College closed

Hospitals
 Franciscan Health Rensselaer, Rensselaer – 46 beds

Climate and weather

Government

The county government is a constitutional body, granted specific powers by the Constitution of Indiana and the Indiana Code.

County Council: The county council is the legislative branch of the county government and controls all the spending and revenue collection in the county. Representatives are elected from county districts. The council members serve four-year terms. They are responsible for setting salaries, the annual budget, and special spending. The council also has limited authority to impose local taxes, in the form of an income and property tax that is subject to state level approval, excise taxes, and service taxes.

Board of Commissioners: The executive body of the county is made of a board of commissioners. The commissioners are elected county-wide, in staggered terms, and each serves a four-year term. One of the commissioners, typically the most senior, serves as president. The commissioners are charged with executing the acts legislated by the council, collecting revenue, and managing the day-to-day functions of the county government.

Court: The county maintains a small claims court that can handle some civil cases. The judge on the court is elected to a term of four years and must be a member of the Indiana Bar Association. The judge is assisted by a constable who is also elected to a four-year term. In some cases, court decisions can be appealed to the state level circuit court.

County Officials: The county has several other elected offices, including sheriff, coroner, auditor, treasurer, recorder, surveyor, and circuit court clerk, elected to four-year terms. Members elected to any county government position are required to declare a political party affiliation and to be residents of the county.

Jasper County is part of Indiana's 4th congressional district. It is also part of Indiana Senate districts 5 and 7 and Indiana House of Representatives districts 4, 16 and 20.

Demographics

As of the 2010 United States Census, there were 33,478 people, 12,232 households, and 9,165 families in the county. The racial makeup of the county was 95.8% white, 0.6% black or African American, 0.4% Asian, 0.2% American Indian, 2.0% from other races, and 1.0% from two or more races. Those of Hispanic or Latino origin made up 5.4% of the population. In terms of ancestry, 27.6% were German, 16.5% were Irish, 9.6% were Dutch, 9.3% were English, 6.9% were American, and 6.0% were Polish.

Of the 12,232 households, 35.8% had children under the age of 18 living with them, 60.7% were married couples living together, 9.3% had a female householder with no husband present, 25.1% were non-families, and 20.9% of all households were made up of individuals. The average household size was 2.66 and the average family size was 3.07. The median age was 38.0 years.

The median income for a household in the county was $47,697 and the median income for a family was $63,842. Males had a median income of $50,984 versus $32,313 for females. The per capita income for the county was $23,676. About 7.7% of families and 9.0% of the population were below the poverty line, including 14.1% of those under age 18 and 5.7% of those age 65 or over.

Religion
The Catholic church is the biggest denomination in the county with 4,341 members, the second largest is the Reformed Church in America with 1,502 members and 2 churches (First Church and American Reformed Church) the third is the United Methodist Church with 1,300 members, the fourth largest is the Christian Reformed Church in North America with 1,013 members in 3 congregations as of 2010.

See also
 National Register of Historic Places listings in Jasper County, Indiana

References

External links
 
 myLocal: Jasper County

 
Indiana counties
1838 establishments in Indiana
Populated places established in 1838
Northwest Indiana
Chicago metropolitan area
Sundown towns in Indiana